Deane House, also known as Pritchard Farm, is a historic plantation house and farm located near Cofield, Hertford County, North Carolina.  The house is a two-story, five bay Georgian period frame dwelling. It has a shed porch across the front, and a rear ell. Also on the property are the contributing small board-and-batten outbuilding, a large gable-roof outbuilding with additions, three gable-roof barns, and a rectangular well-house.

It was listed on the National Register of Historic Places in 1982.

References

Plantation houses in North Carolina
Houses on the National Register of Historic Places in North Carolina
Georgian architecture in North Carolina
Houses in Hertford County, North Carolina
National Register of Historic Places in Hertford County, North Carolina